Vulcano is an auxiliary ship that entered service with the Italian Navy on 12 March 2021. She is designed to support fleet operations with fuel and dry stores. Along with another future sister ship, she is expected to replace the replenishment oilers (AORs). A second vessel was ordered in January 2022 for projected delivery in 2025. The Navy also has an option for a third ship of the class.

The French Navy through OCCAR ordered four modified ships of the class to replace its s to be delivered in 2023, 2025, 2027 and 2029. The program is known as the Bâtiment ravitailleur de forces (BRF). France officially joined the program in October 2018.

Design and construction
Vulcano was built by Fincantieri as hull number 6259. The stern section was built at the Riva Trigoso Naval Shipyard and the bow section is being built at the Castellammare di Stabia (Naples) Naval Shipyard. On the night of 22/23 July 2018, a fire broke out on the ship's stern superstructure.

Vulcano is designed as a support ship able to supply a large naval squadron at sea. She was commissioned in March 2021. A second ship of the class, Jacques Chevallier for the French Navy, began sea trials in December 2022. Steel was cut on a second ship for the French Navy in February 2022 and on a second ship for the Italian Navy in July 2022.

The ships have the capability to:
 refuel ships
 produce fresh water
 carry cargo
 Hospital NATO Role 2 LM
 conduct repairs at sea with integrated maintenance workshops
She has a cargo capacity of up to 15,500 t,
of which, "at least":
  (+9,000 m3) of NATO F76 diesel fuel
  (+4,000 m3) of NATO F44/JP5 aviation fuel
  of fresh water
  of ammunitions
  of meals (30,000 food rations)
 3 m3 of gasoline in barrels
  of lubricant in barrels
  of solid goods
 up to 8 x ISO1C standard containers,  each one

Ships of the class
Italics indicate the estimated date

References

External links
 Ships Marina Militare website

Auxiliary ships of the Italian Navy
Auxiliary replenishment ship classes
Proposed ships
Ships built by Fincantieri

de:Vulcano-Klasse